Velinalloor  is a village in Kollam district in the state of Kerala, India.

Demographics
 India census, Velinalloor had a population of 27065 with 13041 males and 14024 females.

References

Villages in Kollam district